Larry Kidney (born August 29, 1939 in Topeka, Kansas) was an American powerlifter. He placed 6th in the 1980 World's Strongest Man Contest held at the Playboy Club in Vernon, New Jersey. and has held several state, national, and world records in the sport of Powerlifting.

Kidney was inducted to the California Powerlifting Hall of Fame in 2004 and holds several California Powerlifting Records.

References

External links
Kidney Larry  at AllPowerlifting.com

American powerlifters
Sportspeople from Topeka, Kansas
Living people
1939 births